Tatsuki Fujimoto Before Chainsaw Man, known in Japan as , is a Japanese two-volume anthology collection of one-shot stories written and illustrated by Tatsuki Fujimoto. The two volumes, 17-21 and 22-26, were released in October and November 2021, respectively.

Overview
Tatsuki Fujimoto Before Chainsaw Man consists of eight earliest one-shot stories written and illustrated by Tatsuki Fujimoto before starting his second manga series Chainsaw Man. The tankōbon volume was published by Shueisha on October 4, 2021.

The volume was released on November 4, 2021.

In North America, Viz Media announced that they had licensed both volumes in June 2022.

Volume list

References

Further reading

External links
 
 

2021 manga
Comedy anime and manga
Fantasy anime and manga
Horror anime and manga
Manga anthologies
Shueisha manga
Shōnen manga
Viz Media manga